The eighth season of the Canadian reality competition show Top Chef Canada was broadcast on Food Network in Canada. It is the Canadian spin-off of Bravo's hit show Top Chef. The program takes place in Toronto, and is hosted by Eden Grinshpan.  Season eight features 12 chefs of various backgrounds considered to be the next generation of culinary stars in Canada. The final challenge was held at the historic Elora Mill in Elora, Ontario, with shopping done at the St. Jacobs Farmers' Market in St. Jacobs, Ontario.

Contestants
12 chefs competed in season 8.  Contestants are listed in the alphabetical order of their surnames.

Francis Blais, 27, Chef de Cuisine, Montreal, QC
Brock Bowes, 41, Chef/Food Truck Owner, Kelowna, BC
Dominique Dufour, 32, Chef/Restaurant Owner, Ottawa, ON
Adrian Forte, 31, Chef Consultant, Toronto, ON
Shaun Hussey, 40, Chef/Deli Owner, St. Johns, NL
Xin Mao, 36, Chef/Bistro and Bar Owner, Vancouver, BC
Lucy Morrow, 26, Executive Chef, Charlottetown, PE
Jo Notkin, 43, Catering Chef, Montreal, QC
Stephanie Ogilvie, 36, Chef de Cuisine, Halifax, NS
Elycia Ross, 27, Chef/Food Truck Owner, Calgary, AB
Nils Schneider, 27, Pastry Chef, Calgary, AB
Imrun Texeira, 25, Sous Chef, Ottawa, ON

Contestant Progress 

 The top four of this quickfire were exempt from cooking during this elimination challenge.
 Stephanie and Imrun were involved in a cook-off for the last place in the finals which took place in episode 8. Stephanie won which meant that Imrun was eliminated.

 (WINNER) The chef won the season and was crowned Top Chef.
 (RUNNER-UP) The chef was a runner-up for the season.
 (WIN) The chef won that episode's Elimination Challenge.
 (HIGH) The chef was selected as one of the top entries in the Elimination Challenge, but did not win.
 (IMMUNE) The chef was immune from elimination, and exempted from cooking during this Elimination Challenge.
 (LOW) The chef was selected as one of the bottom entries in the Elimination Challenge, but was not eliminated.
 (OUT) The chef lost that week's Elimination Challenge and was out of the competition.
 (IN) The chef neither won nor lost that week's Elimination Challenge. They also were not up to be eliminated.

Episodes

References 

Canada, Season 8
2020 Canadian television seasons